
Year 308 BC was a year of the pre-Julian Roman calendar. At the time, it was known as the Year of the Consulship of Mus and Rullianus (or, less frequently, year 446 Ab urbe condita). The denomination 308 BC for this year has been used since the early medieval period, when the Anno Domini calendar era became the prevalent method in Europe for naming years.

Events 
 By place 
 Greece 
 Ptolemy crosses from Asia Minor into Greece, where he takes possession of Corinth, Sicyon and Megara.
 Ptolemy makes peace with  Cassander
 Cleopatra of Macedon is assassinated by the order of Antigonus

 Roman Republic 
 The Second Samnite War escalates when the tribes of the central Apennines, the Umbrians, Picentini, and Marsians join the war against Rome. However, Rome is able to control the uprising.
 The Etruscans sue for peace with Rome, which is granted by the Romans on severe terms.

Births 
 Hiero II, Greek Sicilian tyrant and king of Syracuse (approximate date)
 Zhao Sheng, Chinese chancellor of the Zhao State (approximate date)

Deaths 
 Cleopatra of Macedon, sister of Alexander the Great and daughter of King Philip II of Macedon and Olympias (b. c. 356 BC)

References